Frehley's Comet was an American rock band formed and led by ex-Kiss lead guitarist Ace Frehley. The group released two studio albums and one live EP before Frehley left the band to release his 1989 solo album, Trouble Walkin'.  

The band name was a pun of a pun; Bill Haley & His Comets was a 1950s Rock-n-Roll band that derived its name as a pun of the typical mispronunciation of Halley's Comet (properly pronounced as "Hal-lee", rhymes with "valley", but commonly mispronounced as "Hay-lee"), a comet which orbits the Sun near Earth about every 75 years.  It also helped people pronounce Frehley's name properly to connect it to the common mispronunciation of Halley as "Hay-lee", as in "Fray-lee" vs. the common mispronunciation as "Free-lee".

History

Before forming a band for his post-KISS career, Frehley had previously done a solo album in 1978 which was the most successful of the Kiss solo albums, and laid the groundwork for his solo career. Frehley left Kiss in 1982, but retained a one-quarter share in Kiss and could not release any solo projects until 1985 without losing that share. During this time Ace put together a band for his solo work, the original line-up consisted of Richie Scarlet on guitar, John Regan on bass, and Anton Fig on drums. This band, together with keyboardists  Arthur Stead and later Frehley's friend from the Bronx, Rob Sabino, played live and demoed 20 songs in various sessions with producers Eddie Kramer, Tony Bongiovi, Chris Kimsey and Vini Poncia.

However, before they made their initial record, Scarlet (and Sabino) was replaced by Tod Howarth who played guitar and keyboards. Frehley's Comet was supposed to simply be the title of Frehley's next solo album, but Frehley decided to use that as the name of the band rather than release the record as a solo artist.  Fig did not tour for the album and was replaced by Billy Ward as touring drummer. For the second album, Second Sighting, Fig was replaced on drums by veteran Eric Clapton Band member Jamie Oldaker who also did the tour. Two studio albums and one live album were released under the "Frehley's Comet" moniker (The live album, Live+1 featured four songs performed live in concert and one original studio song). Howarth and Oldaker left shortly after the last show under the Frehley's Comet name, opening for Iron Maiden in August 1988.

In 1989, for Trouble Walkin',  his third studio release, Frehley dropped the Frehley's Comet name and put out a pure "Ace Frehley" solo album. Tod Howarth was replaced by a returning Richie Scarlet, and Jamie Oldaker by ex-Riot drummer Sandy Slavin (although Anton Fig and ex-Kiss Drummer Peter Criss did perform some of the percussion work on the album.) The album featured numerous guest vocalists including Criss and Sebastian Bach. The tour ended and the band dissolved after John Regan resigned with immediate effect after a show in Las Vegas on April 11, 1990. Frehley did not perform live in any form for two years after that, until July 1992.

Frehley put his solo career on hold to rejoin Kiss in 1996. He has since resumed his solo career with Richie Scarlet back in his touring band. After touring Australia together with Gene Simmons and his solo band in 2018, Frehley fired his entire solo band including Scarlet with whom he had played on and off since 1984 and replaced them with Simmons's backing band.

The band played various one-off reunion shows in 2017 and 2018 with Frehley, Tod Howarth, John Regan, and Anton Fig together.

Personnel

Members
 Ace Frehley – lead guitar, lead vocals (1984-1988)
 John Regan – bass guitar, drums, backing vocals (1984-1988)
 Anton Fig – drums, percussion (1984-1987)
 Tod Howarth – rhythm guitar, keyboards, piano, lead vocals (1986-1988)
 Richie Scarlet – rhythm guitar, vocals (1984-1985)
 Arthur Stead – keyboards (1984-1985)
 Rob Sabino - keyboards (1985-1986) 
 Billy Ward – drums, percussion (1987-1988)
 Jamie Oldaker – drums, percussion, backing vocals (1988) (died 2020)

Timeline

Line-ups

Discography

Studio albums

Live albums/EPs

Demos
Sterling Sound tape June 12, 1984 - Back Into My Arms Again (Stead/Frehley), I Got the Touch (Stead/Frehley), I'm An Animal (Stead/Kimsey/Regan), I Will Survive (Stead/Frehley), Breakout (Carr/Scarlet/Frehley), We Got Your Rock (Kupersmith/Frehley). Produced by Eddie Kramer.
Demo 2, 1984/85 - Audio/Video, Give It to Me Anyway, Dolls. Produced by Eddie Kramer (unconfirmed)
Summer 1985 demo - Stranger in a Strange Land (Frehley), Back on the Streets (Vincent/Friedman), I Heard an Angel (Scarlet), Rock or Be Rocked (Bob Halligan Jr.), Baby It's You (Mack David, Barney Williams, Burt Bacharach - The Beatles cover)
Power Station studio demo 1985 - Dolls (Frehley), Into the Night (Ballard), Words Are Not Enough (Jim Keneally/Frehley), The Hurt is On (Frehley/Sabino), The Boys are Back in Town (Thin Lizzy cover). Produced by Tony Bongiovi.
Vini Poncia demo 1985/86? - Remember Me (Frehley/Cathcart), Wired-Up (Jeff Paris (musician)), The Girl Can't Dance (Danny Tate/Taylor Rhodes). Produced by Vini Poncia.

Filmography
Live+4 (1988) (VHS)

See also
 List of glam metal bands and artists

References

External links
Official Richie Scarlet Website
Official Anton Fig Website
Official Tod Howarth Website

Glam metal musical groups from New York (state)
Heavy metal musical groups from New York (state)
Musical groups established in 1984
Musical groups disestablished in 1988